Doi Suthep–Pui National Park is a national park in Chiang Mai Province in Thailand. It includes Wat Phra That Doi Suthep, a Buddhist temple, and Bhubing Palace, the winter residence of the Thai royal family. The park is a protected area for flora, fauna, and habitat.

History
The former name of the area is Doi Aoi Chang. The name Doi Suthep was inspired by a hermit named Prarusiwa Suthep who once lived in the local forest. In 1973, the Royal Forest Department proposed that this and 13 other forests be designated national parks. It became the 24th national park of Thailand when it was official established on 14 April 1981. Today it includes 160,812 rai ~  of territory.

Geography and climate

The mountainous landscape is part of the Thanon Thong Chai Range. Low winter temperatures can reach . Late summer is the rainy season, with daily precipitation.

Flora

More than 2,000 species of vascular plants have been documented in the national park.

The park is forested, with evergreen forest above  and deciduous forest below. Mixed deciduous-evergreen forest occurs in gullies and along streams. Common trees include oaks, dipterocarps, and trees of the magnolia family. There are many waterfalls.

The forests in the park are divided into two main types of forests. Deciduous forests are found up to about 900-1,000 meters above sea level, while lower montane evergreen forests are found starting from about 900-1,000 meters above sea level.

The dipterocarp deciduous forest is primarily composed of Dipterocarpus tuberculatus, Dipterocarpus obtusifolius, Shorea siamensis, and Shorea obtusa. The oak species Quercus kerrii is also found in the deciduous forest. Other major non-dipterocarp tree species in the deciduous forest are Pterocarpus macrocarpus, Xylia xylocarpa, Terminalia mucronata, Terminalia alata, and Vitex peduncularis.

The pine tree Pinus kesiya is found at higher elevations.

The montane evergreen forest primarily consists of Schima wallichii, Castanopsis acuminatissima, Castanopsis tribuloides, Magnolia baillonii, Magnolia garrettii, among other tree species. Tectona grandis and Cassia fistula used to be common, but are no longer widely found due to centuries of logging.

Fungi
The park is home to diverse fungi species, many of which may be undescribed or have only been recently described.

Fungi in the park primarily belong to the families Boletaceae, Agaricaceae and Russulaceae. A 2007 survey found 30 species of ascomycetes and 228 species of basidiomycetes in the forests surrounding Chiang Mai city.

Different species and genera tend to occupy different ecological niches:
dry dipterocarp forests: Russula, Boletus, and Amanita
wet dipterocarp forests: Amanita, Lactarius, and Russula
pine forests: Lactarius and Amanita
oak forests: Russula, Lactarius, Amanita, and Boletus

Mushrooms belonging to the genera Astraeus, Heimiella, Pterygellus, and Mycoamaranthus are also found in the park.

Dozens of wild fungi species are locally harvested for human consumption. Mushrooms are often collected from dipterocarp forest floors during the rainy season from June to October. They include:

However, care must be taken to distinguish edible species from local poisonous species such as Amanita exitialis, Amanita fuliginea, Amanita fuligineoides, Amanita cf. virgineoides, Cantharocybe cf. gruberi, Chlorophyllum globosum, Chlorophyllum molybdites, Clitocybe sp., Coprinopsis lagopus, Entoloma cf. caespitosum, Entoloma cf. subclitocyboides, Inocybe sp., Megacollybia cf. fallax, Panaeolus cyanescens, Russula emetica, Amanita gleocystidiosa, Cantharocybe virosa, and other poisonous species belonging to the genera Entoloma, Lactarius, and Tricholoma.

Fauna
Animals in the park include the crocodile salamander (Tylototriton verrucosus). Mammals include the common muntjac (Muntiacus muntjak) and wild boar (Sus scrofa). More than 300 species of birds have been recorded in the area, including pheasants, eagles, parrots, bulbuls and minivets.

Mammals
Small mammals found in the lower montane evergreen forest include the ferret-badger (Melogale personata), ground squirrel (Menetes berdmorei), noisy rat (Leopoldamys sabanus), lesser short-nosed fruit bat (Cynopterus brachyotis), while small mammals found in the deciduous forest include the common tree shrew (Tupaia glis), Burmese striped squirrel (Tamiops mcclellandii), belly-banded squirrel (Callosciurus flavimanus), white-bellied flying squirrel (Petinomys setosus), chestnut white-bellied rat (Niviventer fulvescens), yellow rajah rat (Maxomys surifer), root rat (Rattus rattus), and dark-tailed subspecies of Bower's white-toothed rat (Berylmys bowersi bowersi).

Frugivorous mammals in the park include Pallas's squirrel (Callosciurus erythraeus), red-cheeked squirrel (Dremomys rufigenis), Phayre's flying squirrel (Hylopetes phayrei), Burmese striped squirrel (Tamiops mcclellandii), northern treeshrew (Tupaia belangeri), common palm civet (Paradoxurus hermaphroditus), masked palm civet (Paguma larvata), and northern pig-tailed macaque (Macaca leonina).

Other small mammals found in the park are Rattus tanezumi, Rattus exulans, Rhizomys pruinosus, Hylomys suillus, and Crocidura vorax.

Birds
Frugivorous birds include the black-crested bulbul (Pycnonotus flaviventris), mountain bulbul (Ixos mcclellandii), puff-throated bulbul (Alophoixus pallidus), and ashy bulbul (Hemixos flavala).

In the Monthathan Waterfall area, bird species include:

Top canopy: red-billed blue magpie (Urocissa erythroryncha), Eurasian jay (Garrulus glandarius), coppersmith barbet (Psilopogon haemacephalus), great barbet (Psilopogon virens), rosy minivet (Pericrocotus roseus), Asian paradise flycatcher (Terpsiphone paradisi)
Middle canopy: bronzed drongo (Dicrurus aeneus), golden-fronted leafbird (Chloropsis aurifrons), red-whiskered bulbul (Pycnonotus jocosus), sooty-headed bulbul (Pycnonotus aurigaster), black-crested bulbul (Rubigula flaviventris), ashy woodswallow (Artamus fuscus), little green bee-eater (Merops orientalis)
Lower canopy: white-crested laughingthrush (Garrulax leucolophus), lesser necklaced laughingthrush (Garrulax monileger), emerald dove (Chalcophaps indica), blue whistling thrush (Myophonus caeruleus), scaly-breasted partridge (Tropicoperdix chloropus), grey wagtail (Motacilla cinerea), white wagtail (Motacilla alba)

Reptiles and amphibians
Reptiles in the park include Platysternon megacephalum, Calotes emma alticristata, Pseudocalotes kakhienensis, Pseudocalotes microlepis, Gekko gecko, Ptychozoon kaengkrachanense, Tropidophorus thai, and the recently described gecko species Cyrtodactylus doisuthep. Other reptiles reported from the park include the Rough-bellied Mountain Dragon (Acanthosaura lepidogaster), Green Keelback (Rhabdophis nigrocinctus), Reeve's Smooth Skink (Scincella reevesii), Assam Mountain Snake (Plagiopholis nuchalis), Berdmore's Water Skink (Tropidophorus berdmorei), Speckled Forest Skink (Eutropis macularia), Khasi Hills Keelback (Hebius khasiense), Burmese False Bloodsucker (Pseudocalotes microlepis), Sphenomorphus spp., and Scincella spp.

Reptile and amphibian species vary according to elevation. Frog species inhabiting mountainous streams include  Amolops marmoratus, Limnonectes taylori, Sylvirana nigrovittata, and Odorrana chloronota. The Doi Suthep caecilian (Ichthyophis youngorum) is named after Doi Suthep. The Dwarf Bush Frog (Philautus parvulus) and Limborg's Frog (Limnonectes limborgi) have also been reported from the park.

Invertebrates
Thousands of insect species are found in the park, including 561 species of butterflies.

Recreation
Activities in the park include walking and hiking, cycling, camping, tours of caves, waterfalls, and other features, observation of plants, birds, and butterflies, cultural and historical sightseeing, and stargazing.

See also
List of national parks of Thailand
List of Protected Areas Regional Offices of Thailand

References

National parks of Thailand
Protected areas established in 1981
IUCN Category II
Geography of Chiang Mai province
Tourist attractions in Chiang Mai province
1981 establishments in Thailand
Thanon Thong Chai Range